The Hama offensive may refer to a number of offensives launched by either armed Syrian opposition forces toward city of Hama or by Syrian government forces against rebels north of Hama.

 Hama Governorate clashes (2011–12)
 2012 Hama offensive
 2013 Hama offensive
 2014 Hama offensive
 2015 Hama offensive
 2016 Hama offensive
 Hama offensive (March–April 2017)
 Hama offensive (September 2017)
 Northeastern Hama offensive (2017)
 2018 Hama offensive
 Northwestern Syria offensive (April-August 2019)